Anastasia Beverly Hills, also known as ABH, is an American cosmetics company best known for its eyebrow products. The company was founded by Romanian-born Anastasia Soare in 1997, in Beverly Hills, California. Soare's daughter Claudia Soare, also known as Norvina, is the president of the company. In 2018, the company was reported to be worth $3 billion and have over $200 million in operating income.

Background
Anastasia Beverly Hills was founded in 1997 by Anastasia Soare when she opened her flagship salon in Beverly Hills. The company's first product line was released in 2000. The brand has become known for its eyebrow products and for introducing a new brow-shaping service to customers, the "Golden Ratio Eyebrow Shaping Method." The Method aims to finding balance, symmetry, and beauty through the creation of arches that perfectly frame any face shape.

Since its launch, Anastasia Beverly Hills has grown to sell over 485 products in over 2,000 stores worldwide, including Dillard’s, Macy’s, Nordstrom, Sephora and ULTA. Their products are also sold in over 25 countries.

Controversy
In July 2017, ABH released the Subculture eyeshadow palette. Online reviewers criticized the poor blendability and excessive fallout of the eyeshadows, leading the company to apologize on social media.

Collaborations
ABH has collaborated with a few social media beauty influencers to create and promote new products. 

In 2016, ABH collaborated with "Makeup by Mario" to create a master eyeshadow palette. The palette was announced through Kim Kardashian’s Snapchat account, and Mario named two of the eyeshadows after her. Mario Dedivanovic has been Kardashian's make-up artist for many years. 

In 2017, ABH collaborated with Nicole Guerriero to create a glow kit containing six highlighters. Guerriero and ABH both promoted the product on Instagram. 

In 2018, ABH collaborated with Amra Olevic, also known as AmRezy, to create an individual highlighter. The highlight/illuminator is sparkly, with a gold finish. It is suitable for all skin types.

In 2019, ABH collaborated with Jackie Aina to create an eyeshadow palette catering to darker skin tones, something ABH had neglected in the past. Later that year, the brand collaborated with YouTuber Carli Bybel to create an eyeshadow palette with 14 shades. 
Also in 2019, drag queen Alyssa Edwards released a 14 pan eyeshadow palette with ABH including a loud and campy range of shades. 

In 2020, ABH collaborated with AmRezy again to design a 16 shade eyeshadow palette.

In 2022, ABH announced its collaboration with Los Angeles-based brand Dundas to launch its gender-neutral makeup collection. Called the Dundas Enhancers, this collection is set to launch in early 2023.

References

External links

American brands
American companies established in 2000
Cosmetics companies of the United States
Privately held companies based in California
Cosmetics brands